M108 or M-108 may refer to
 M-108 highway (Michigan), a road in the United States
 M108 Howitzer, an American self-propelled 105 mm howitzer
 HMS Grimsby (M108), a minehunter in the Royal Navy
 Messier 108, a spiral galaxy in the constellation Ursa Major